The Umachal rock cave is a fifth-century rock cave with inscriptions discovered in Kalipur, Guwahati in February 2012. The inscriptions were done during the rule of king Mahendra Varman of Kamarupa. The interior side of the cave measures 6.26x5.02 metres. Once temple of Balabhadra swami, two pieces of a broken stone bowl measuring 16.5 cm in diameter have been found inside the cave. Floral carving measuring 76x73x16 cm were drawn on the rock surface.

See also
 Umachal rock inscription
Kamakhya Temple
 Kamakhya locality

References

Indian inscriptions
Caves of Assam
Kamarupa (former kingdom)
History of Guwahati